Ray Tabano (a.k.a. Crazy Raymond) (born December 23, 1946) is an American musician, who was a founding member of Aerosmith in 1970.

Tabano was replaced by Brad Whitford in 1971, at which time he concentrated on maintaining the band's office, hangout, and recording studio, "The Wherehouse". Tabano started the band's fan club and line of merchandise, designing and selling merchandise himself and writing the band's fan club newsletters. He was fired in 1979, by Aerosmith's managers Steve Leber and David Krebs.

Friendship with Steven Tyler 

Tabano was a childhood friend of Aerosmith lead singer Steven Tyler in their hometown of Yonkers, New York. They would eventually form into Steven's first band, The Strangeurs.

The Strangeurs 

Originally called the Strangers, the Strangeurs added a "u" to their name to avoid confusion with another band called the Strangers. The band consisted of Ray Tabano on bass guitar, Steven Tyler on drums, Green Mountain Boys member Don Soloman on keyboards and vocals, Peter Stahl on Guitar, Alan Strohmayer on bass, and Barry Shapiro on drums. The Strangeurs played in the local area as a cover band. The band focused on Top 40 hits and earned a steady wage as a party band around the New England area.

After Aerosmith 

As of September 2009, Tabano was running a catering company in Yonkers, New York.

In 2014, Tabano was featured on an episode of Pawn Stars where he sold two prototype Aerosmith tour T-shirts to Rick Harrison. One was signed by the band; the other had both Tyler's and Tabano's names on the sizing tag. Tabano originally asked $3000 for both shirts, but after having them appraised for about $2400, Harrison bought them for $1100.

In 2018, Tabano was featured on an episode of American Pickers where he authenticated an International Harvester Metro Van as having been used by Aerosmith in the early days of the band's career.  The van was purchased by the show's Mike Wolfe for $25,000, after which the van was restored on behalf of the band, who then bought it back.

References

1946 births
Living people
Aerosmith members
American rock bass guitarists
American male bass guitarists
American rock guitarists
American male guitarists
People from the Bronx
People from Yonkers, New York
American people of Italian descent
20th-century American guitarists